Shane Ford (born 8 September 1969) is a Jamaican cricketer. He played in 28 first-class and 19 List A matches for the Jamaican cricket team from 1993 to 1999.

See also
 List of Jamaican representative cricketers

References

External links
 

1969 births
Living people
Jamaican cricketers
Jamaica cricketers
Cricketers from Kingston, Jamaica